Caloptilia syrphetias is a moth of the family Gracillariidae. It is known from Brunei, China (Sichuan, Fujian, Hubei), Hong Kong, India, Indonesia (Sulawesi), Japan (Honshū, Kyūshū, the Ryukyu Islands), Malaysia (Pahang), Sri Lanka and Thailand.

The wingspan is 13.5-16.5 mm.

The larvae feed on Persea thunbergii. They mine the leaves of their host plant.

References
Meyrick, 1906. The Journal of the Bombay Natural History Society. P. 984

syrphetias
Moths of Asia
Moths described in 1907